The 1917 Samoa earthquake occurred on June 26 at 05:49 UTC. The epicenter was located in the southwest of the Samoan Islands. The earthquake's estimated moment magnitude of 8.3–8.5 and surface-wave magnitude of 8.4 makes it the strongest recorded earthquake in this region.

Many subsidences were reported. In the mountains, masses of rocks were hurled down. In Apia, violent shaking lasted for about a minute and half. In American Samoa, the LDS Church in Pago Pago and the Catholic Church in Leone were partly demolished. A tsunami was triggered by the earthquake, which affected both American Samoa and German Samoa, which was then under Allied occupation. Many houses were destroyed, and a bridge was washed away in Palauli. The tsunami was also recorded in Honolulu and on the west coast of the United States. Just on May 1, 1917, a large earthquake of magnitude  8.0 occurred in the Kermadec Islands region. The tsunami caused by the earthquake in May also hit the Samoan Islands.

The earthquake occurred to the southwest of the Samoa Islands, along the Tonga Plate boundary. The focal mechanism of this earthquake was unclear. This earthquake and the 2009 event were not thought to represent the same repeating process in a same location.

See also
List of earthquakes in 1917
List of earthquakes in Samoa

References

External links

Samoa earthquake, 1917
Megathrust earthquakes
1917 tsunamis
Earthquakes in Samoa
Earthquakes in American Samoa
1917 disasters in Oceania